Estância Roque is a settlement in the eastern part of the island of Fogo, Cape Verde. In 2010 its population was 411. It is situated 3 km west of Cova Figueira and 19 km east of the island capital São Filipe. Nearby places include Figueira Pavão in the south and Cabeça Fundão in the northwest.

See also
List of villages and settlements in Cape Verde

References

Villages and settlements in Fogo, Cape Verde
Santa Catarina do Fogo